The Highland Railway Cumming 4-4-0 class was a pair of 4-4-0 steam locomotives designed by Christopher Cumming, the Locomotive Superintendent of the Highland Railway

Dimensions
Weight was a half-hundredweight short of 56 long tons.

Numbering

Transfer to LMS
Both survived into London, Midland and Scottish Railway ownership in 1923, but neither lasted until nationalisation, as both were withdrawn and scrapped as non-standard engines in the mid-1930s. The LMS had classed them as 3P.

References

4-4-0
4-4-0 locomotives
Hawthorn Leslie and Company locomotives
Railway locomotives introduced in 1916
Scrapped locomotives
Standard gauge steam locomotives of Great Britain

Passenger locomotives